Filipp Savchenko (born 20 November 1991 is a Russian professional ice hockey forward. He is currently playing with PSK Sakhalin of Asia League Ice Hockey (ALIH).

Savchenko made his Kontinental Hockey League (KHL) debut playing with Avtomobilist Yekaterinburg during the 2010–11 KHL season.

References

External links

1991 births
Living people
JHC Avto players
Avtomobilist Yekaterinburg players
Barys Nur-Sultan players
HK Neman Grodno players
Russian ice hockey forwards
PSK Sakhalin players
Snezhnye Barsy players
Sportspeople from Yekaterinburg